Natividad Betty Veizaga Siles (Vacas, Cochabamba, 1957) is a Bolivian folk music musician.

She can play the charango and the ronroco and sings mainly in Quechua.

She started in Vacas local radio station and she is a member of Grupo Pukaj Wayra with her siblings, and duets Takiytinku with her husband Rufo Zurita, and Quilla Zurita with her daughter.

Discography

Betty Veizaga in Grupo Pukaj Wayra 
 Ama Sua, Ama Qhella, Ama Llulla, Lyrichord disc - United States, 1981.
 A Mi Tierra, Origo 1004 - (Europe), 1984
 Vi bygger en skola, 1987.
 Vaqueñita, Lauro - Bolivia, 1993.
 Tinkuy, Lauro - Bolivia, 1994
 Así es mi tierra, Lauro - Bolivia, 1997; Sol de los Andes - Ecuador, 1998.
 Con sentimiento a mi tierra, Lauro - Bolivia, 1999.
 Canta conmigo ..., Lauro - Bolivia, 2000.
 El valluno cholero, Bolivia.

Betty - Quilla and Grupo Pukaj Wayra 
 Nuestra ilusión, Lauro - Bolivia, 2003.
 A mi Bolivia, Bolivia, 2009.

Betty - Quilla 
 Con lo mejor y algo más, Bolivia.

Takiytinku (Rufo Zurita - Betty Veizaga) 
 Un encuentro de canto tradicional, Bolivia.
 El valluno cholero, Bolivia.
 Lo Nuevo, lo Mejor de Pukay Wayra, Bolivia.
 Soledad, Bolivia, 2010.

Betty Veizaga and Rolando Quinteros 
 Carnavaleando con..., Bolivia.

External links
Betty Veizaga, Pukaj Wayra

1957 births
Living people
People from Arani Province
20th-century Bolivian women singers
Bolivian folk musicians
21st-century Bolivian women singers